Carlos de Almeida (born 11 December 1969) is a Brazilian rower. He competed in the men's coxed pair event at the 1992 Summer Olympics.

References

External links

1969 births
Living people
Brazilian male rowers
Olympic rowers of Brazil
Rowers at the 1992 Summer Olympics
Pan American Games medalists in rowing
Pan American Games bronze medalists for Brazil
Rowers at the 1991 Pan American Games
Rowers at the 1995 Pan American Games